Taylor Werner (born May 1, 1998) is an American middle- and long-distance runner. Representing the University of Arkansas, her team won the 2019 NCAA Division I Cross Country Championships. Werner is the Pan American U20 Championships 3000 m champion.

Professional
Werner, running the fastest time 5K in the U.S. during the winter season, recorded a personal best 15:11.19 during a win at Boston University on December 7. 2019, in Boston, Massachusetts.

NCAA @ Arkansas 
Werner is a student-athlete from University of Arkansas in Fayetteville, Arkansas, where she earned 7 All-American honors and is a 3 time Southeastern Conference Champion.

Werner was recruited to the University of Arkansas for track and cross country in 2016, Werner's first NCAA championship appearance was at the 2016 NCAA Division I Cross Country Championships, where she finished 16th. She qualified for and placed twenty-second in the 5000 m at the 2017 NCAA Division I Outdoor Track and Field Championships.

Early life 
Werner was raised in Bloomsdale, Missouri, the sister of Shelby Werner, an NCAA Division II runner at Missouri Southern State Lions. Taylor is a Four-time XC All- American high school runner.

References

External links
 
 

1998 births
Living people
American female track and field athletes
American female middle-distance runners
American female long-distance runners
Arkansas Razorbacks women's track and field athletes
Arkansas Razorbacks women's cross country runners
Sportspeople from Missouri
Track and field athletes from Missouri
People from Ste. Genevieve, Missouri
University of Arkansas alumni
21st-century American women